Lambo may refer to:

 Lambo (boat), an Indonesian traditional merchant boat
 Lambo (Reborn!), a fictional character from the manga series Reborn!
 Lambo (album), the 14th studio album by Anna Vissi
 Lamborghini, an Italian sports car manufacturer
 Lambo 291, a Formula One car raced in 1991 by the Modena F1 team

See also
 Lamb (disambiguation)
 Rambo (disambiguation)